Matthew Edmondson (born 27 December 1985) is a British television and Sony Award-nominated radio presenter, best known for his work with BBC Radio 1 and ITV2.

Edmondson currently presents the weekend afternoon show Fridays, Saturdays and Sundays from 1pm to 4pm with Mollie King. In 2016, he co-presented The Xtra Factor alongside Rylan Clark-Neal on ITV2.

Career

Television
Edmondson was a CBBC continuity presenter from 2004 to 2006, prior to which, in 2002, he was a roving reporter for Channel 4's Richard & Judy.

Edmondson co-presented the 2008 coverage of the Isle of Wight Festival for ITV2. He also provided links and commentary for the MTV coverage of the 2008 MTV Europe Music Awards. He presented reports from T in the Park 2009 for BBC One Scotland, BBC Two Scotland and BBC Three.

Edmondson also provided voiceovers for 4Music and presented Channel 4's Freshly Squeezed from 2010 until 2011.

In May 2010, Edmondson presented highlights from The Great Escape Festival and the Topman CTRL Student Tour on Channel 4.

On 27 June 2016, it was announced that Edmondson would co-host The Xtra Factor Live alongside Rylan Clark-Neal on ITV2. The series began on 27 August 2016 and was broadcast live from The Hospital Club. The show was axed in January 2017.

Edmondson narrated the third series of Impractical Jokers UK on Channel 5 and Comedy Central in 2016. In 2017, Edmondson took part in the BBC's  Let's Sing and Dance for Comic Relief.

In November 2016, Edmondson provided the voiceover for the adverts for Now That's What I Call Music! 95, when regular voiceover Mark Goodier suffered a stroke.

He presents the ITV2 dating series Dress to Impress. From 2017, Edmondson replaced Reggie Yates as the presenter of Release the Hounds on ITV2.

Radio
On 8 January 2010, Edmondson joined BBC Radio 1, and appeared every Friday on Fearne Cotton's show to report on entertainment news and showbiz gossip. His first appearance on Cotton's programme was on 15 January 2010.

Edmondson began presenting the Sunday 10am to 1pm slot on BBC Radio 1 on 14 March 2010, filling in for regular presenter Sara Cox while she was on maternity leave.

Edmondson started a weekly show on BBC Radio 1 on 6 April 2011 replacing Huw Stephens from 9pm to 10pm on Wednesdays. However, on 19 December 2012, he presented his last Wednesday night show before moving to weekends in January 2013, taking over Vernon Kay's Saturday 10am1pm slot and Sara Cox's Sunday 10am1pm slot.

On 10 April 2018, it was announced that Edmondson and Mollie King would co-present a new afternoon show for BBC Radio 1 beginning in June on Fridays, Saturdays and Sundays.

In 2018, Edmondson hosted a BBC radio podcast programme in which he and his co-host deliberately vandalised Wikipedia to see how long the vandalism would last.

Other work
Edmondson was a columnist for The X Factor magazine. He appeared in the music video for the song "Make Peace Not War" by British grime artist Skepta.

Personal life
Edmondson is originally from Portsmouth and attended St Edmund's Catholic School and Havant College. He now lives in Lewisham, south-east London. His elder sister Kate Arnell is also a television presenter. In May 2012, Edmondson became engaged to his long-term girlfriend Bryony Emmett, and the pair married in 2013. In September 2016, Edmondson missed an episode of The Xtra Factor Live. During the show, it was announced that Bryony had gone into labour, and at the end of the show it was announced that she had given birth to a girl. In January 2022, Bryony gave a birth to a second girl. 

In 2020, Edmondson revealed in his Twitter thread that his father killed himself when he was 22. He was an alcoholic and had bipolar disorder, specifically stating that he has a diagnosis of cyclothymia. Edmondson wrote a song about it with the vocals of Aymee Weir. The song is "Your Car".

References

External links
Matt and Mollie (BBC Radio 1)
Radio 1's Party Anthems (BBC Radio 1)
 Independent Talent Presenters

Living people
1985 births
English television presenters
English radio DJs
BBC Radio 1 presenters
Mass media people from Portsmouth
People with bipolar disorder